Zhao Yunlei (born 25 August 1986) is a mixed and women's doubles badminton player from China. She graduated with a BA from Huazhong University of Science and Technology. She is the first and only badminton player to have ever won two gold medals in the same Olympic edition, winning in both the mixed and women's doubles categories in 2012. Zhao joins the ranks with nine other players with two Olympic gold medals, the highest number of gold medals won by any badminton player. Through her performance at the 2014 and 2015 BWF World Championships, she became the first player to win two consecutive gold medals in two consecutive BWF World Championships.

As of the 2015 BWF World Championships, she has become the most successful player in the World Championship  medal count, with a total of ten medals, overtaking Gao Ling, who has a total of nine. In addition, by winning the 2015 BWF World Championships mixed doubles title, she and partner Zhang Nan have won three World Championship mixed doubles titles, the first pairing ever to have done so. Zhao had won numerous prestigious titles both in the mixed and women's doubles including the Olympics, World Championships, Asian Games, Asian Championships, and All England Open Championships, as well as the World Mixed Team Championships (Sudirman Cup), World Women's Team Championships (Uber Cup), Asian Games Women's Team gold medal, and Asia Women's Team Championships.

She is regarded by many as one of the best female doubles players in the history of badminton alongside past greats, such as former teammate Gao Ling. Zhao has achieved massive overall success in both the mixed and women's doubles, having won a total of 63 individual career titles (38 in mixed, 25 in women's doubles). Among these 63 individual titles, 42 of them are Superseries titles (27 in mixed, 15 in women's doubles), making her the third most successful player in terms of overall Superseries achievements, and the most-successful female player in this regard as well. After the 2016 Olympics, Zhao retired from international badminton competition.

Career 
Zhao played with Tian Qing in the women's doubles and with Zhang Nan in the mixed doubles. She first achieved the world number 1 in the BWF World ranking with partner Cheng Shu in November 2009. She then partnered with Zhang Nan in the mixed and occupied the world number 1 in January 2011. After separated with Cheng, Zhao competed in the women's doubles event with Tian Qing, and again topped the world ranking in September 2012.

2010 
Zhao and Zhang won the 2010 All England Open mixed doubles title, being the first players and pairing to have ever won the title through beginning at the qualifying stage. Zhao and Tian won the 2010 Asian Games gold medal after vanquishing compatriots Wang Xiaoli and Yu Yang 20–22, 21–15, and 21–12. Zhao also participated in China's women's team which gain a gold medal too.

2011 
In January, Zhao and Zhang won the World Superseries Finals (having held during January 2011) in Taipei. They defeating Sudket Prapakamol and Saralee Thungthongkam of Thailand 21–17, 21–12 in the final. Zhao also reached the final in the women's doubles with Cheng. Two weeks later, they triumphed at Seoul by winning the Korea Open. In the final, they conquered compatriots Tao Jiaming and Tian Qing. Zhao and Tian reached the women's doubles final as well. In August, at the 2011 BWF World Championships in London, Zhao and Zhang won the mixed doubles title, with this being Zhao's first ever overall World Championship gold medal and first ever mixed doubles World Championship gold medal. She also won a silver medal in the women's doubles with Tian as well. In October, Zhao and Zhang reached the Denmark Open mixed doubles semi-final but they lost to Denmark's Joachim Fischer Nielsen and Christinna Pedersen 12–21, 21–14, and 20–22. However, Zhao and Zhao managed to reverse this, by winning against Fischer Nielsen and Pedersen in the mixed doubles finals at both the Hong Kong and China Open's. In December, Zhao and Zhang won the World Superseries Finals, successfully defending the title first won in January of the 2011 year.

2012 
In July–August at the London Olympics, she won two gold medals in the mixed doubles with Zhang Nan and women's doubles with Tian Qing.

2013 
In August, at the 2013 BWF World Championships in Guangzhou, she won bronze in both the mixed doubles with Zhang and the women's doubles with Tian.

2014 
In August, at the 2014 BWF World Championships in Copenhagen, she won both the mixed doubles with Zhang and the women's doubles with Tian, with this being Zhao's first World Championship women's doubles gold medal. In September, Zhao and Zhang won the 2014 Asian Games mixed doubles title, avenging the loss from four years ago. In December, Zhao and Zhang won the Dubai World Superseries Finals. Zhao was also awarded as the 2014 BWF Female Player of the Year.

2015 
In August, at the 2015 BWF World Championships in Jakarta, she successfully defended her titles in both the mixed and women's doubles with partner Zhao and Tian respectively.

2016 
In April–May, Zhao and Zhang won the Asian Championships. In August, she and Zhang won a bronze medal in the mixed doubles at the 2016 Rio Olympics. This is her third Olympic medal in addition to the two golds won four years ago.

2018 
One and a half years after her retirement from the international tournaments, Zhao returning to the national team as an assistant coach.

Personal life 
Zhao was in a relationship with her mixed doubles partner, Zhang Nan. But just before the 2016 Summer Olympics, she announced that they had parted ways. In 2018, she married Hong Wei, another former national teammate and men's doubles shuttler.

Achievements

Olympic Games 
Women's doubles

Mixed doubles

BWF World Championships 
Women's doubles

Mixed doubles

Asian Games 
Women's doubles

Mixed doubles

Asian Championships 
Women's doubles

Mixed doubles

East Asian Games 
Women's doubles

Asian Junior Championships 
Girls' doubles

BWF Superseries 
The BWF Superseries, which was launched on 14 December 2006 and implemented in 2007, is a series of elite badminton tournaments, sanctioned by the Badminton World Federation (BWF). BWF Superseries levels are Superseries and Superseries Premier. A season of Superseries consists of twelve tournaments around the world that have been introduced since 2011. Successful players are invited to the Superseries Finals, which are held at the end of each year.

Women's doubles

Mixed doubles

  BWF Superseries Finals tournament
  BWF Superseries Premier tournament
  BWF Superseries tournament

BWF Grand Prix 
The BWF Grand Prix had two levels, the BWF Grand Prix and Grand Prix Gold. It was a series of badminton tournaments sanctioned by the Badminton World Federation (BWF) which was held from 2007 to 2017.

Women's doubles

Mixed doubles

  BWF Grand Prix Gold tournament
  BWF Grand Prix tournament

BWF International Challenge/Series 
Women's doubles

  BWF International Challenge tournament
  BWF International Series tournament

Awards and nominations

References

External links 

 
 
 2010 Asian Games Badminton Biography

1986 births
Living people
People from Yichang
Badminton players from Hubei
Chinese female badminton players
Badminton players at the 2012 Summer Olympics
Badminton players at the 2016 Summer Olympics
Olympic badminton players of China
Olympic gold medalists for China
2016 Olympic bronze medalists for China
Olympic medalists in badminton
Medalists at the 2012 Summer Olympics
Medalists at the 2016 Summer Olympics
Badminton players at the 2010 Asian Games
Badminton players at the 2014 Asian Games
Asian Games gold medalists for China
Asian Games silver medalists for China
Asian Games bronze medalists for China
Asian Games medalists in badminton
Medalists at the 2010 Asian Games
Medalists at the 2014 Asian Games
World No. 1 badminton players
BWF Best Female Player of the Year
Chinese badminton coaches